Ellis Hughes Cleaver Jr. (12 September 1892 – 31 October 1980) was a Liberal party member of the House of Commons of Canada. He was born in Burlington, Ontario and became a lawyer by career.

Biography
He was called to the bar in 1914 and later elected as Reeve of Burlington in 1918, but resigned in order to serve with the 1st Canadian Tank Battalion towards the end of World War I. He was elected as Burlington's Mayor in 1920.

He was first elected to Parliament at the Halton riding in the 1935 general election, running as a Liberal-Progressive candidate but later allying with the Liberals. He was afterwards re-elected under the Liberal banner for successive terms in 1940, 1945 and 1949. He specialized in committee work during his time there, and served as Chairman of the Banking and Commerce Committee for ten years, of the War Expenditures Committee for two years, as well as of the Government-owned Railway and TCA Committee.

Cleaver left the House of Commons after completing his fourth term in office, the 21st Canadian Parliament, and did not seek another term in the 1953 election upon being reinstated as a barrister by the Law Society of Upper Canada. In his professional work afterwards, he was a key player in the development of many of Burlington's subdivisions, and helped to establish the Joseph Brant Memorial Hospital.

Electoral record

			

Note: Progressive Conservative vote is compared to "National Government" vote in 1940 election.

Note: "National Government" vote is compared to Conservative vote in 1935 election.

Notes

References

External links
 

1892 births
1980 deaths
Canadian military personnel of World War I
Lawyers in Ontario
Liberal Party of Canada MPs
Mayors of Burlington, Ontario
Members of the House of Commons of Canada from Ontario